Eastern Suburbs may refer to:

Places
Eastern Suburbs (Mumbai), India
Eastern Suburbs (Sydney), Australia
Eastern Suburbs railway line, Sydney, Australia

Sports clubs

Association football
Eastern Suburbs AFC, Auckland, New Zealand
Eastern Suburbs F.C., Brisbane, Australia
Hakoah Sydney City East FC, formerly called Eastern Suburbs, Sydney, Australia

Cricket
 Eastern Suburbs Cricket Club, Sydney, Australia

Rugby league
 Eastern Suburbs RLFC, the previous name of the Sydney Roosters
 Eastern Suburbs Tigers, a Brisbane club

Rugby union
Eastern Suburbs RUFC, Sydney, Australia
Eastern Suburbs RUFC (Canberra), Australia
Eastern Suburbs Rugby Union Football Club Inc., Tasmania
Easts Tigers Rugby Union, Brisbane, Australia

See also
Easts (disambiguation)